Audun-le-Tiche is a commune in the Moselle department in Grand Est in northeastern France.

Location and rail links
Audun-le-Tiche is located adjacent to Esch-sur-Alzette, on the border with Luxembourg, and close to the borders of Germany, and Belgium.

Audun-le-Tiche is served by a railway station that is served by both the French national railway and the Chemins de Fer Luxembourgeois, on whose Line 60 it is located.

History
The name Audun comes from Awedeux, as a phonetical evolution of Latin Aquaeducta, and le Tiche is an evolution of Thieux, meaning "the German" — cf. Deutsch. The corresponding town Audun-le-Roman lies in the former Romance, or Latin-speaking area, where Audun-le-Tiche is the other side of the language border, in the Germanic-speaking area. Nowadays, these two cities are respectively named Deutsch-Oth and Welsch-Oth in German.

The town was long associated with the mining industry. The history of mining in Audun-le-Tiche and its decline has been described in the writings of Aurélie Filippetti.
The Villeroy & Boch ceramic manufacturing company was founded in 1748 in Audun by François Boch. The company headquarter later moved to nearby Luxembourg, and in 1801 to Mettlach, Germany.

Audun sister town is Gualdo Tadino in Italy, from which immigrants came working in mining industry during the 19th century.

Population

See also
 Communes of the Moselle department

References

External links
 

Communes of Moselle (department)
Duchy of Bar